The Loggerhead Creek is a tidal stream in North Andros the Bahamas.

There are also a Loggerhead Creek and Little Loggerhead Creek in Central Andros.

See also
List of rivers of the Bahamas

References

Rivers of the Bahamas